Bulbophyllum newportii, commonly known as the cupped strand orchid, is a species of epiphytic or lithophytic orchid that is endemic to tropical North Queensland. It has widely spaced, oval or cone-shaped, light green pseudobulbs, a single stiff, dark green egg-shaped leaf and up to eight bell-shaped white, cream-coloured or greenish flowers with a long, narrow yellow labellum. It grows on trees and rocks, usually at moderate to high elevations.

Description
Bulbophyllum newportii is an epiphytic or lithophytic herb that forms dense clumps. Flowering occurs between September and December.

Taxonomy and naming
The cupped strand orchid was first formally described in 1902 by Frederick Manson Bailey who gave it the name Sarcochilus newportii and published the description in The Queensland Flora from a specimen collected on Mount Alexandra by Howard Newport. In 1909 Robert Allen Rolfe changed the name to Bulbophyllum newportii. The specific epithet (newportii) honour the collector of the type specimen.

Distribution and habitat
Bulbophyllum newportii grows on trees and rocks, mostly at moderate to high altitudes, usually in humid, airy locations and often in exposed places. It is found on the McIlwraith Range and between the Cedar Bay National Park and Eungella National Park in Queensland.

References

newportii
Orchids of Queensland
Endemic orchids of Australia
Plants described in 1902